Qamsar District is a district (bakhsh) in Kashan County, Isfahan Province, Iran. At the 2006 census, its population was 10,812, in 3,409 families.  The District has two cities: Qamsar and Jowshaqan va Kamu. The District has two rural districts (dehestan): Jowshaqan-e Qali Rural District and Qohrud Rural District.

References 

Kashan County
Districts of Isfahan Province